Manuel Antonio Rojo del Río y Vieyra (September 24, 1708 – January 30, 1764) was a Mexican (originally Spanish Criollo) friar who served as the 16th Archbishop of Manila and was Governor-General of the Philippines at the commencement of the 1762–1764 British occupation of the Philippines.

Early life
Rojo del Río was born in Tula, Mexico on September 24, 1708. On 1758, he was consecrated archbishop of the Archdiocese of Manila.

On May 31, 1759, the death of Governor-General Pedro Manuél de Arandía left the position vacant. Bishop Miguel Lino de Ezpeleta of the Archdiocese of Cebu succeeded him as well as becoming acting Archbishop of Manila. On 22 July 1759, Rojo del Río was enthroned as Archbishop of Manila. In 1761, a royal decree from Spain ruled that Rojo del Río replace Ezpeleta to become Governor-General.

Del Río died in office on 20 January 1764.

Governorship
"Albeit he had the gift of knowledge, he had no judgment, especially in matter military, to which he was hostile and negative, since this was an area outside his profession and character."  This was to prove fatal during the capture of Manila.

See also

British occupation of Manila

References

External links
 Rojo del Rio at www.catholic-hierarchy.org

1708 births
1764 deaths
18th-century Roman Catholic archbishops in the Philippines
Roman Catholic archbishops of Manila
British invasion of Manila
Captains General of the Philippines
People of the Seven Years' War
People from Hidalgo (state)
Roman Catholic Archdiocese of Manila